Southdown Power Station was a natural gas-fired combined cycle gas turbine cogeneration power station in Southdown, a suburb in southern Auckland, New Zealand. When operational, it was New Zealand's northernmost power station with a capacity exceeding 50 MW.

History
The plant was developed by the Southdown Cogeneration Joint Venture, a joint venture between TransAlta and Mercury Energy.  The plant had two LM6000 gas turbines and one steam turbine, fueled on natural gas and producing 114MW. The plant was expected to emit about 410,000 tonnes of carbon dioxide annually.

In 2000, Mighty River Power purchased 50% of the plant and purchased the remainder in 2002.  A third LM6000 gas turbine was added in 2007.  This was operated in open cycle mode.

Operation
Southdown was owned and operated by electricity generator Mighty River Power (now Mercury Energy), and complemented the company's renewable hydroelectric and geothermal stations. The station, strategically located in the south-central Auckland urban area, provided voltage support for the city, and helped to meet the peak demand requirements in the Auckland region. Southdown was also extensively used during dry periods, when there was insufficient water to run Mighty River Power's eight hydroelectric power stations on the Waikato River at full capacity.

Apart from generating 170 MW of electricity for the wider Auckland area, Southdown also provided steam to the local industrial area near the station.

In the 2008 - 2009 financial year, Might River Power reported 249,407 tonnes of carbon dioxide emissions from Southdown.

In March 2015, Mighty River Power announced that it would decommission Southdown and sell the plant overseas.

See also
 List of power stations in New Zealand

References

External links
Southdown - Mighty River Power Generation

Natural gas-fired power stations in New Zealand
Buildings and structures in Auckland